The 1981 Los Angeles Rams season was the team's 44th year with the National Football League (NFL) and the 36th season in Los Angeles. The Rams looked to improve on their 11-5 record from 1980. The team failed to improve upon their 11-5 record, and finished with a mediocre 6-10 record and missed the playoffs for the first time since 1972.

This year's Rams squad also suffered the humiliation of being the first to be swept by NFC West rival New Orleans.

For the season, the Rams converted from gray facemasks to blue facemasks.

Offseason

NFL Draft

Undrafted free agents 

The Rams were touted as a possible Super Bowl contender prior to this season. However, Vince Ferragamo, who had previously led the Rams to Super Bowl XIV and set a Rams record the previous season with 30 touchdown passes, decided to bolt for the Canadian Football League's Montreal Alouettes. Pat Haden was named the starter, but with most of the offensive weapons that Ferragamo had, notably WR's Preston Dennard and Billy Waddy. Also, the Rams would benefit from the return of running back Wendell Tyler, who had missed most of the previous season with a hip injury from an automobile accident.

Personnel

Staff

Roster

Regular season

Schedule

Standings

See also 
Other Anaheim–based teams in 1981
 1981 California Angels season

References

External links 
 1981 Los Angeles Rams at Pro-Football-Reference.com

Los Angeles Rams
Los Angeles Rams seasons
Los Ang